Nothoalsomitra suberosa is a species of subtropical vines in the family Cucurbitaceae, the only member of the monotypic genus Nothoalsomitra. Native to Queensland in Australia. 

The species is a vigorous climber with pale corky bark and leaves divided into three triangular leaflets. Flowers have a yellow corolla with five petals. Fruits are a green and ovoid with numerous seeds.

N. suberosa is listed as rare and is restricted to wet sclerophyll forest and sub-tropical rainforest in the D'Aguilar Range, Blackall Range and Conondale ranges north of Brisbane.

This plant was once placed in the related genus Neoalsomitra.

It was first described and published in Fl. Australia Vol.8 on page 388 in 1982.

References

External links 
 Information on N. suberosa from an Australian environment group
 Another photo and information
 Image of fruit
 Distribution Map

Flora of Queensland
Monotypic Cucurbitaceae genera
Cucurbitoideae
Rosids of Australia
Plants described in 1982